Bernard Petitbois (born 19 July 1954 in Antananarivo) is a Malagasy-born French former athlete who specialised in sprinting events. He competed at the 1980 Summer Olympics. In addition, he won a bronze medal at the 1982 European Indoor Championships.

International competitions

Personal bests
Outdoor
100 metres – 10.40 (-0.1 m/s, Viry-Chatillon 1978)
200 metres – 20.82 (0.0 m/s, Les Abymes 1979)
Indoor
60 metres – 6.63 (Milan 1982)

References

All-Athletics profile

1954 births
Living people
People from Antananarivo
French male sprinters
Olympic athletes of France
Athletes (track and field) at the 1980 Summer Olympics
French sportspeople of Malagasy descent
Mediterranean Games silver medalists for France
Mediterranean Games medalists in athletics
Athletes (track and field) at the 1979 Mediterranean Games